The 1927–28 Auburn Tigers men's basketball team represented Auburn University in the 1927–28 college basketball season. The team's head coach was Mike Papke, who was in his third season at Auburn. The team played their home games at Alumni Gymnasium in Auburn, Alabama. They finished the season 20–2, 12–1 in SoCon play to win the SoCon regular season championship. They defeated Clemson, Georgia Tech, and Mississippi A&M to advance to the championship game of the Southern Conference tournament where they lost to Mississippi.

Schedule and results

|-
!colspan=9 style=| Regular season

|-
!colspan=9 style=| SoCon tournament

References

Auburn Tigers men's basketball seasons
Auburn
Auburn Tigers
Auburn Tigers